Matthieu Louis-Jean (born 22 February 1976 in Mont-Saint-Aignan) is a French former footballer, who is currently head scout for Olympique de Marseille. He finished his career at Norwich in June 2005 after several seasons at Nottingham Forest, who he joined from Le Havre AC in 1999 following a loan spell. An experienced full-back, Louis-Jean made 198 league appearances for Forest. His transfer to Norwich was a player exchange deal that saw Gary Holt move to the City Ground.

Louis-Jean made just two appearances for Norwich at the start of his first season with the club (2005–06) before injury problems ruled him out of action for the remainder of the campaign. The Frenchman was near a return to the first team, but an injury playing for the reserve team saw his recovery set back yet again.

Norwich manager Peter Grant announced in February 2007 that Louis-Jean would be released at the end of the 2006–07 season.

Louis-Jean spent time as a scout for Nottingham Forest, before joining Marseille as head scout in April 2021.

References

External links
Career information at ex-canaries.co.uk

1976 births
Living people
French footballers
Le Havre AC players
Nottingham Forest F.C. players
Norwich City F.C. players
Association football fullbacks
Premier League players
Expatriate footballers in England
French expatriate footballers
People from Mont-Saint-Aignan
Sportspeople from Seine-Maritime
Footballers from Normandy